Synoeca chalibea is a swarm-founding social wasp that ranges from Costa Rica to Brazil. The species name was originally published in 1852 as chalibea, but misspelled as chalybea in most subsequent publications.

References

Vespidae
Hymenoptera of South America
Insects described in 1852